State (Lower Dandenong/Cheltenham) Highway, also known as Lower Dandenong/Cheltenham State Highway (after its longest constituent parts), is an 12.5 km stretch of continuous road in the southeastern suburbs of Melbourne, Australia. These names are not widely known to most drivers, as the entire allocation is still best known as by the names of its constituent parts: Lower Dandenong Road, Cheltenham Road, and Foster Street. This article will deal with the entire length of the corridor for sake of completion, as well to avoid confusion between declarations.

Route
Lower Dandenong Road (and the beginning of the highway) starts at the interchange with Nepean Highway, Mentone, and heads east as a four-lane single-carriageway road until it meets Boundary Road in Braeside, where it widens into a four-lane, dual-carriageway road and continues east, widening again into a six-lane, dual-carriageway highway past the full diamond interchange with Mornington Peninsula Freeway, continuing east until it reaches the intersection with Springvale Road. As Cheltenham Road it continues east through Keysborough past the half diamond interchange with EastLink, until it meets Hammond Road in Dandenong, where it narrows back into a four-lane, single-carriageway road, crosses under the Pakenham railway line, intersects with and changes name to Foster Street, before it (and the end of the highway) ends at the intersection with Princes Highway in central Dandenong.

History
State (Lower Dandenong/Cheltenham) Highway (as its constituent roads) was allocated Metropolitan Route 10 between Mentone and Dandenong in 1965. It continues west beyond Nepean Highway along entire length of Balcombe Road to Black Rock.

The passing of the Transport Act of 1983 (itself an evolution from the original Highways and Vehicles Act of 1924) provided for the declaration of State Highways, roads two-thirds financed by the State government through the Road Construction Authority (later VicRoads). The State Highway (Lower Dandenong Road, Cheltenham Road) was declared a State Highway in December 1990, from Nepean Highway in Mentone to Lonsdale Street in Dandenong; the road was known (and signposted) as its constituent parts.

The passing of the Road Management Act 2004 granted the responsibility of overall management and development of Victoria's major arterial roads to VicRoads: in 2004, VicRoads declared the road as State (Lower Dandenong/Cheltenham) Highway (Arterial #6050), from Nepean Highway in Mentone to Lonsdale Street in Dandenong, however the road is still presently known (and signposted) as its constituent parts.

Major Intersections

References

See also

List of Melbourne highways

Highways and freeways in Melbourne
Transport in the City of Greater Dandenong
Transport in the City of Kingston (Victoria)
Dandenong, Victoria